The women's 100 metres competition at the 1968 Summer Olympics in Mexico City, Mexico. The event was held at the University Olympic Stadium on October 14–15.

The race was won by defending champion Wyomia Tyus.  She became the first person to defend the championship at 100 metres, a feat later duplicated by Carl Lewis, Gail Devers, Shelly-Ann Fraser-Pryce, Usain Bolt and Elaine Thompson-Herah. Director Bud Greenspan filmed Tyus casually dancing behind her starting blocks before the Olympic final.  When interviewed later she said she was doing the "Tighten Up" to stay loose.  American commentator Dwight Stones suggests this intimidated her opponents.

In the final, American teenager Margaret Bailes gained a step advantage at the gun.  That quickly disappeared as Tyus seized control of the race.  The chase was on.  The next chasers appeared to be her American teammate Barbara Ferrell and Australian teenager Raelene Boyle.  Coming on strong toward the finish was Polish veteran Irena Kirszenstein.  Tyus dipped at the finish, but there was nobody near her.  Ferrell and Boyle were escorted to the holding area, but Officials reading the new fully automatic time system corrected the results to declare Kirszenstein the bronze medalist.  Tyus set the world record while Boyle set the List of world junior record in fourth place.

Tyus was credited with 11.0 hand timed, breaking the tie at 11.1 with several women in this race.  Two years later, Chi Cheng, 7th place in this race, equalled her time.  Her automatic time of 11.07 was the first noted automatic time record of this event.  In the subsequent Olympics, that time was equalled by Renate Stecher, but Tyus' time was downgraded to 11.08.  By the time fully automatic timing became mandatory, January 1, 1977, Annegret Richter's 11.01 from the 1976 Olympics had displaced them.

Competition format
The women's 100m competition consisted of heats (Round 1), quarterfinals, semifinals and a Final. The five fastest competitors from each race in the heats qualified for the quarterfinals. The four fastest runners from each of the quarterfinal races advanced to the semifinals, where again the top four from each race advance to the final.

Records
Prior to this competition, the existing world and Olympic records were as follows:

Results

Heats

Heat 1

Heat 2

Heat 3

Heat 4

Heat 5

Heat 6

Quarterfinals

Quarterfinal 1

Quarterfinal 2

Quarterfinal 3

Quarterfinal 4

Semi-finals

Semifinal 1

Semifinal 2

Final

References

External links
 Official Olympic Report, la84foundation.org. Retrieved August 15, 2012.

Athletics at the 1968 Summer Olympics
100 metres at the Olympics
1968 in women's athletics
Women's events at the 1968 Summer Olympics